Karl Templer is a British-born New York-based fashion stylist. He is creative director of Interview and his work has appeared in publications internationally including Vogue Italia, Vogue Paris, W, and The New York Times. Templer has styled brand campaigns and shows for designers including Alexander Wang, Calvin Klein, Sacai and Valentino, and collaborates frequently with photographers Fabien Baron, David Sims, Craig McDean, Steven Meisel.

Life and career

Early life 
Templer’s first job was at the Covent Garden store Woodhouse, which in the late 80s was breaking ground in men’s fashion. His interest in clothes and popular-culture led him to shooting tests with emerging London photographers. The photos would be featured in Nick Logan’s magazine The Face.

Fashion career
Arena Homme + launched in 1994 and Templer was made an editor for the title – later becoming creative director. It was during this time he started working with Mikael Jansson and styling womenswear.

At the age of 27, photographer Steven Meisel booked Templer for the November 1997 issue of Italian Vogue – one of his first jobs for the publication for which he has subsequently styled 34 covers. In 1998 Templer relocated to New York. He started contributing to the Conde Nast title W where he began collaborating with the likes of David Sims.

Templer became the creative director of the Warholian monthly culture anthology Interview in 2008. He has styled the likes of Anne Hathaway, Claire Danes, Jay-Z, Kanye West, Kristen Stewart, Marion Cotillard, Michelle Williams, Ryan Gosling and Scarlett Johansson for the magazine’s cover.

In 2007 Templer styled the controversial July issue of Italian Vogue entitled ‘Super Models Enter Rehab’. In 2009 he styled the CFDA portraits of America’s most influential designers including Marc Jacobs, Laura and Kate Mulleavy of Rodarte and Jack McCollough and Lazaro Hernandez of Proenza Schouler.
In recent years while continuing to work on editorial for Interview magazine and Vogue Italia, Templer consults on shows and advertising campaigns for the likes of Coach and Tommy Hilfiger. He maintains an ongoing partnership with the house of Valentino, as well as with designers Alexander Wang and Chitose Abe of Sacai. In August 2019, Karl Templer and Fabien Baron became the new creative directors of Ports 1961.

Personal life 
Templer was born in London and now lives in Chelsea, New York City.

References 

Year of birth missing (living people)
Living people
American business executives
Fashion stylists
Fashion designers from London
British emigrants to the United States